Slavic folklore encompasses the folklore of the Slavic peoples from their earliest records until today. Folklorists have published a variety of works focused specifically on the topic over the years.

See also

 Vladimir Propp, Russian folklorist who specialized in morphology
 Supernatural beings in Slavic religion
 Deities of Slavic religion

Notes

References
Kononenko, Natalie O. 2007. Slavic Folklore: A Handbook. Greenwood Press.